Thomas Kirjonen (born 27 March 1985), better known as Kasmir, is a Finnish singer, musician and record producer. Kasmir's debut single "Vadelmavene" was released in April 2014 and peaked at number one on the Finnish Singles Chart. His debut solo album AMK Dropout was produced by Hank Solo and Jonas W. Karlsson and was released 19 September 2014. The album was the first in Finland to certify gold based on downloads and streams.

Prior to launching his solo career, he was a member and lead singer of the Finnish rock band Collarbone. The band that also included Janne Suominen (guitar), Mikko Merilinna (guitar), Matti Piipponen (bass) and Janne Sivunen (drums) was formed in 2000 and released two studio albums, The Back of Beyond in 2007 and Pretty Dirty in 2010.

Kirjonen is signed as a writer to Elements Music.  He participated in the sixth season of the music reality television series Vain elämää.

Discography

Albums

Singles

Featured in
2013: "Spaceman" (Aste featuring Kasmir)
2013: "Kiinni" (Sanni featuring Kasmir)
2013: "On the Edge" (HeavyWeight featuring Kasmir)
2014: "Box of Lego" (tyDi featuring Kasmir & Sinead Burgess)
2015: "Milloin nään sut uudestaan?" (Robin featuring Kasmir)

References

External links
Facebook

1985 births
Living people
Singers from Helsinki
21st-century Finnish male singers
Finnish pop singers
Finnish soul singers